The red-cheeked flying squirrel (Hylopetes spadiceus) is a species of rodent in the family Sciuridae. It is found in Indonesia, Malaysia, Myanmar, Singapore, Thailand, and Vietnam.

References

Red-cheeked flying squirrel
Rodents of Indonesia
Rodents of Malaysia
Rodents of Singapore
Rodents of Myanmar
Rodents of Vietnam
Red-cheeked flying squirrel
Red-cheeked flying squirrel
Rodents of Thailand
Taxonomy articles created by Polbot